CCIP may refer to:
 Centre for Critical Infrastructure Protection, New Zealand
 Cisco Certified Internetwork Professional, one of the Cisco Career Certifications
 Common Configuration Implementation Program
 Constantly computed impact point
 Paris Chamber of Commerce (Chambre de Commerce et d'Industrie de Paris) 
 Contractor Controlled Insurance Program, an alternative to an Owner Controlled Insurance Program in the construction industry

 Cross-Chain Interoperability Protocol, an omnibus blockchain feature of Chainlink